Anita Håkenstad (born 19 February 1968) is a Norwegian long-distance runner who specialized in marathon races and cross-country running. She now competes in mountain running.

Her highest place from the IAAF World Cross Country Championships was a 30th place from 1986. The same year she finished sixth in the 3000 metres at the inaugural World Junior Championships in Athletics. In the World Cross Country team competition her highest place was sixth in 1987. In the marathon she finished 48th at the 1996 Summer Olympics and competed at the World Championships in 1995 and 1997 without managing to finish. She became Norwegian champion in 5000 metres in 1987, and in half marathon in 1996.

Personal bests
5000 metres - 15:44.66 min (1992) - tenth among Norwegian 5000 m runners.
Half marathon - 1:12:21 hrs (1996) - eleventh among Norwegian half marathon runners.
Marathon - 2:30:08 hrs (1996) - fifth among Norwegian marathon runners, only behind Ingrid Kristiansen, Grete Waitz, Stine Larsen and Kirsten Otterbu.

Achievements

References

External links
 

1968 births
Living people
Norwegian female long-distance runners
Norwegian mountain runners
Athletes (track and field) at the 1996 Summer Olympics
Olympic athletes of Norway
Athletes from Oslo
Norwegian female marathon runners
World Long Distance Mountain Running Championships winners